Ethel Maude Field  (née Bryant, 20 December 1882 – 5 July 1967) was a New Zealand community leader. She was born in Wellington, New Zealand on 20 December 1882.

In the 1953 New Year Honours Field was appointed a Member of the Order of the British Empire for services to the community, especially in connection with women's organisations.

References

1882 births
1967 deaths
People from Wellington City
New Zealand Members of the Order of the British Empire